Dev Kumar (born 4 February 1972) is a Dalit writer and dramatist from India. A member of the Bhangi community, he established the Apna Theatre in April 1992. This has performed in Kanpur and surrounding areas with the aim of arousing Dalit consciousness.

Works 
Kumar's plays include:
Daastan
Bhadra Angulimaal
Chakradhari
Sudarshan
Kapat
Agayat Etihaas

References

Living people
1972 births
Dramatists and playwrights from Uttar Pradesh
Hindi-language writers
People from Kanpur